The Harbour Bridge is a beam bridge in Kyiv across the city's harbour, built in 2010.

Overview
The bridge stretches over the entrance to the Kyiv Harbour located between Podil and Obolon neighborhoods. The bridge provides quicker access to Rybalskyi Peninsula and connects both city's embankment streets straightening out the contour of Dnieper right bank.

Previously in its place there already existed cable-stayed bridge that was closed down due to its bad conditions. The construction of the new bridge started in 2005. In 2007 the way was opened to the traffic moving from Podil to Obolon (south-north). In 2010 the construction was completely finished and traffic started to move in both directions.

See also
 Bridges in Kyiv

References

External links
 Harbour Bridge. Kyiv Encyclopedia
 Unique bridges of Ukraine: 12 masterpieces (Унікальні мости України: 12 шедеврів). Argumentua. 13 May 2018

Road bridges in Kyiv
Bridges over the Dnieper
Bridges completed in 2010
2010 establishments in Ukraine